Pierre Monneret (12 January 1931 – 3 March 2010) was a former Grand Prix motorcycle road racer from France. His best year was in 1956 when he finished in fourth place in the 500cc world championship. Monneret won two Grand Prix races during his career.

References

1931 births
French motorcycle racers
125cc World Championship riders
350cc World Championship riders
500cc World Championship riders
2010 deaths